Acrocercops clitoriella is a moth of the family Gracillariidae. It is known from Cuba.

The larvae feed on Clitoria species, including Clitoria ternatea. They probably mine the leaves of their host plant.

References

clitoriella
Moths described in 1934
Moths of the Caribbean
Endemic fauna of Cuba